Allwyn may refer to:
 Astrid Allwyn, an American stage and film actress
 Allwyn Cyclecars, a British cyclecar
 Hyderabad Allwyn Limited, a defunct manufacturing company in Hyderabad, India
 Allwyn Colony, a suburb in Hyderabad, India